Jolmaville is a rural community and census-designated place (CDP) in Ashland County, Wisconsin, United States. As of the 2020 census, it had a population of 126.

The community is in northern Ashland County, within the. It is bordered to the west by Marengo.

References 

Populated places in Ashland County, Wisconsin
Census-designated places in Ashland County, Wisconsin
Census-designated places in Wisconsin